Elcho Island Airport  is an airport on Elcho Island, Northern Territory, Australia.

Airlines and destinations

See also
 List of airports in the Northern Territory

References

External links
Mission Aviation Fellowship

Airports in the Northern Territory